Donald W. Shipley is a retired United States Navy SEAL, who has gained recognition for his activism investigating and publicizing individuals who have made false claims of military service.

Military service
Don Shipley joined the United States Navy in 1978 and became a Navy SEAL in 1984 after graduating from Basic Underwater Demolition/SEAL training BUD/S class 131. Following SEAL Tactical Training (STT) and completion of six month probationary period, he received the NEC 5326 as a Combatant Swimmer (SEAL), entitled to wear the Special Warfare Insignia. Shipley served in  SEAL Team One, SEAL Team Two, the Naval Special Warfare Center, Basic Underwater Demolition/SEAL (BUD/S), and Naval Special Warfare Group Two (NSWG-2), NAB Little Creek, Virginia as a SEAL Advanced Training Instructor.

While serving with SEAL Team Two, Shipley conducted operations in Bosnia and Liberia, although was never involved in combat. He became the first non-corpsman SEAL to graduate from paramedic school. He served in eight SEAL platoons, was platoon chief in five, and awarded the Navy and Marine Corps Medal for heroism during a search and rescue mission.

Setting records for immense water and land demolition shots and running high-risk training courses, he served as an explosive expert instructing police departments across the country in booby traps and improvised explosive devices. When not in a SEAL platoon or deployed overseas, his time was spent running blocks of training for SEALs in air operations, land warfare, and demolitions. After 24 years of Navy service, he retired as a senior chief petty officer in 2003.

Post-military life
After retirement, Shipley worked as a Security Contractor for Blackwater Security Consulting, spending  a year in Pakistan and Afghanistan. Shipley ran a training course with several former U.S. Navy SEALs called Extreme SEAL Experience which trained potential SEALs as well as individuals who were interested in experiencing the rigors of SEAL training.

Don Shipley originally started Extreme SEAL Experience in 1992 for the United States Navy. It was designed to train Sea Cadets for recruitment purposes. It later transformed into a full program designed to prepare those interested in Naval Special Warfare for the intense nature of BUD/S training.

Activism activities
Shipley has garnered attention for his work investigating individuals who claim to have served as SEALs or other high-profile military service claims. He and his wife Diane produced a series of YouTube videos, "Phony Navy SEAL of the Week", which combined footage of Shipley telephoning individuals suspected of false claims and questioning them to determine if stolen valor had occurred and how far the individual would persist in a deceptive claim. The videos also included interactions between him and Diane and video clips that related to the topic at hand.

The YouTube series transitioned into a series of video segments which are privately hosted on his website Extreme SEAL Videos on a paid subscription basis. In addition to a featured show in which Don and Diane travel around the United States to engage individuals who may have stolen valor, there are other video segments, including Q&A sessions, a cooking show hosted by Diane, and footage from the Extreme SEAL Experience training course.

Shipley has also been a Special Guest Contributor at 'SOFREP.com'. The site provides news and analysis from former military and Special Operations veterans. He states, "...the FBI estimates that there are 300 SEAL Impostors for every living Navy SEAL. Verifying at least a dozen and often over 20 fraudulent SEAL claims each day, I put the number much, much higher than 300." He estimates there are roughly 17,600 who have completed Naval Special Warfare training since 1943, about 10,000 of these are alive, and 2,400 of them on active duty.

Shipley's YouTube channel was terminated as of February 21, 2019. He alleged that it was in retaliation for exposing activist Nathan Phillips' claims of having been a Vietnam veteran and "recon ranger" when Phillips had only served in the Marine Corps Reserve as a refrigerator technician and anti-tank missile man.  YouTube issued a statement saying the account was terminated because Shipley was sharing too much identifying information including home addresses and phone numbers in violation of YouTube policies that could lead to harassment of others.

Other work
Shipley is also a film producer, known for Secrets of SEAL Team Six (2011), and Inside Edition (1988).

References

External links 
 
 "Special Farces – The Problem of Stolen Valor" – Article about Shipley's videos
 Don Shipley Website

1961 births
Living people
Military personnel from Pennsylvania
United States Navy SEALs personnel
Internet vigilantism